Vitsika is a Malagasy genus of ants in the subfamily Myrmicinae. Described in 2014, the genus contains 14 species.

Description
Queens are known for all species except V. obscura. The queens may be alate or ergatoid, or both forms may occur within a single species. It is possible that all species will be found to produce both ergatoids and alates when the species are better represented in collections. Two species (V. manifesta, V. suspicax) exhibit morphological intermediates between alate and ergatoid forms, and two species (V. acclivitas and V. crebra) appear to be polygynous.

Worker-associated males are known for V. crebra, V. breviscapa and V. labes. In addition, the males of three other species, collected in isolation (in Malaise traps), are present in collections. Similar in size to the conspecific worker or slightly smaller.

Species

Vitsika acclivitas Bolton & Fisher, 2014
Vitsika astuta Bolton & Fisher, 2014
Vitsika breviscapa Bolton & Fisher, 2014
Vitsika crebra Bolton & Fisher, 2014
Vitsika disjuncta Bolton & Fisher, 2014
Vitsika incisura Bolton & Fisher, 2014
Vitsika labes Bolton & Fisher, 2014
Vitsika manifesta Bolton & Fisher, 2014
Vitsika miranda Bolton & Fisher, 2014
Vitsika obscura Bolton & Fisher, 2014
Vitsika procera Bolton & Fisher, 2014
Vitsika suspicax Bolton & Fisher, 2014
Vitsika tenuis Bolton & Fisher, 2014
Vitsika venustas Bolton & Fisher, 2014

References

Myrmicinae
Ant genera
Hymenoptera of Africa
Insects of Madagascar
Endemic fauna of Madagascar